Bochil is a city and one of the 122 municipalities of Chiapas, in southern Mexico. It covers an area of 372.7 km². Bochil serves as the head town for the Second Federal Electoral District of Chiapas.

As of 2010, the municipality had a total population of 30,642, up from 22,722 as of 2005. 

As of 2010, the city of Bochil had a population of 12,404. Other than the city of Bochil, the municipality had 83 localities, the largest of which (with 2010 populations in parentheses) were: Ajiló (1,271), El Copal (1,133), and Luis Espinoza (1,107), classified as rural.

References

 

Municipalities of Chiapas